In 1960 an International Meeting of Communist and Workers Parties was held in Moscow. It was preceded by a conference of 12 Communist and Workers Parties of Socialist countries held in Moscow November 1957 and the Bucharest Conference of Representatives of Communist and Workers Parties in June 1960. Issues discussed at these meetings are associated with the Sino-Soviet split.

Participants were (Soviet sources omit the names of 3 parties; one is believed to have been the CPUSA):

Albania: Albanian Party of Labour
Algeria: Algerian Communist Party
Argentina: Communist Party of Argentina
Australia: Communist Party of Australia 
Austria: Communist Party of Austria 
Belgium: Communist Party of Belgium
Bolivia: Communist Party of Bolivia
Brazil: Brazilian Communist Party
Bulgaria: Bulgarian Communist Party 
Burma: Burmese Communist Party
Canada:Communist Party of Canada 
Ceylon: Communist Party of Ceylon
Chile: Communist Party of Chile 
China: Communist Party of China
Colombia: Colombian Communist Party
Costa Rica: Popular Vanguard Party
Cuba: Popular Socialist Party
Cyprus: Progressive Party of the Working People
Czechoslovakia: Communist Party of Czechoslovakia
Denmark: Communist Party of Denmark
Dominican Republic: Dominican Popular Socialist Party
Ecuador: Communist Party of Ecuador
El Salvador: Communist Party of El Salvador
Finland: Communist Party of Finland 
France: French Communist Party
Germany (East): Socialist Unity Party of Germany 
Germany (West): Communist Party of Germany
Greece: Communist Party of Greece
Guadeloupe: Communist Party of Guadeloupe  
Guatemala: Guatemalan Party of Labour  
Haiti: Popular Entente Party
Honduras: Communist Party of Honduras 
Hungary: Hungarian Socialist Workers' Party
India: Communist Party of India
Indonesia: Communist Party of Indonesia 
Iran: Tudeh Party of Iran  
Iraq: Iraqi Communist Party
Ireland: Irish Workers League, Communist Party of Northern Ireland
Israel: Communist Party of Israel 
Italy: Italian Communist Party 
Japan: Communist Party of Japan
Jordan: Jordanian Communist Party
Korea: Workers' Party of Korea
Lebanon: Lebanese Communist Party
Luxembourg: Communist Party of Luxembourg
Malaysia: Malayan Communist Party
Martinique: Communist Party of Martinique
Mexico: Mexican Communist Party
Mongolia: Mongolian People's Revolutionary Party
Morocco: Moroccan Communist Party
Nepal: Communist Party of Nepal
Netherlands: Communist Party of the Netherlands
New Zealand: Communist Party of New Zealand 
Nicaragua: Nicaraguan Socialist Party 
Norway: Communist Party of Norway
Pakistan: Communist Party of Pakistan
Panama: People's Party of Panama 
Paraguay: Paraguayan Communist Party
Peru: Peruvian Communist Party
Poland: Polish United Workers' Party 
Portugal: Portuguese Communist Party
Puerto Rico: Communist Party of Puerto Rico
Réunion: Communist Party of Réunion
Romania: Romanian Workers' Party 
San Marino: Communist Party of San Marino
South Africa: South African Communist Party  
Soviet Union: Communist Party of the Soviet Union
Spain: Communist Party of Spain
Sudan: Sudanese Communist Party
Sweden: Communist Party of Sweden
Switzerland: Swiss Party of Labour
Syria: Syrian Communist Party
Thailand: Communist Party of Thailand
Tunisia: Tunisian Communist Party
Turkey: Communist Party of Turkey
United Arab Republic: Communist Party of the UAR
United Kingdom: Communist Party of Great Britain
United States: Communist Party of the United States
Uruguay: Communist Party of Uruguay
Venezuela: Communist Party of Venezuela
Vietnam: Workers Party of Vietnam

Sources

Communist Parties of the World at files.osa.ceu.hu
Osmanczyk, Edmund Jan/Mango, Anthony. Encyclopedia of the United Nations and International Agreements. Taylor & Francis, 2002. p. 428
Sveriges kommunistiska parti. Världsläget och de kommunistiska partiernas uppgifter. Stockholm: Sveriges kommunistiska parti, 1961. pp. 3–4

External links and further reading
The Struggle for Peace, Democracy and Socialism: Documents of Meetings of Representatives of the Communist and Workers’ Parties, Held in Moscow in November 1957, in Bucharest in June 1960, and in Moscow in November 1960
The "Great Debate:" Documents of the Sino-Soviet Split
Statement of eighty-one Communist and Workers Parties which met in. Moscow, USSR, in November, 1960
Speech of Enver Hoxha

Communist parties
International Meeting of Communist and Workers Parties
Political conferences
1960 conferences